Abu Raita al-Takriti, was a 9th-century Syriac Orthodox theologian and apologist.

Biography 
Little is known about Abu Raita's life, and although some sources portray him as a bishop of Tikrit there is no contemporary evidence to support this. Abu Raita referred to himself as a "teacher".
It appears that his reputation as a theologian made him so well known that he was recalled to defend his fellow non-Chalcedonian co-religionists in Armenia.

Armenian tradition mentions that Abu Raita was recalled by the prince Ashot Msaker to defend the miaphysite against the Melkite teachings of Theodore Abū Qurra who was on a missionary activity in Armenia. Abu Raita was unable to travel to Armenia but sent his relative Archdeacon Nonnus of Nisibis with a letter defending his doctrine.
Another story has Abu Raita personally engaging in a debate with Abu Qurra and the East Syriac metropolitan Abdishu ibn Bahriz.

It is possible that his name appears as "Ibn Rabita" in a list of translators of scientific and philosophical works to Arabic provided by Ibn al-Nadim.

He probably died in Tikrit no later than 830 A.D.

Works 
Abu Raita's writings are mainly Dialectical aimed at providing answers to questions asked about Christian doctrines. He relies heavily on Christian scriptures and apologetic methods coupled with principles of Hellenistic philosophy. His methods became highly regarded by later Christian apologetics in the Middle East.

Despite not quoting from the Quran or the Hadith, Abu Raita's writings show deep knowledge of Islam.

Bibliography 
A Risāla of Abū Rāʾitạ l-Takrītī on the proof of the Christian religion and the proof of the Holy Trinity, On the proof of Christianity and the Trinity, By far the most comprehensive of Ibn Raita's works, it contains responses to potential questions of Muslims regarding the Trinity. It also provides arguments supporting incarnation in a detailed reasoning for God's becoming human as well as some Christian practices such as the eucharist, and fasting.
The first Risāla : On the Holy Trinity, On the Trinity, this is the first of three requested by an unknown fellow Syrian Orthodox. Only the first two survive.
The second Risāla of Abū Rāʾitạ l-Takrītī: On the Incarnation
Unknown risāla in a set of three rasāʾil on the Holy Trinity and the Incarnation, this entry appears in a Coptic list of works of theologians.
Witnesses from the words of the Torah, the prophets and the saints, its text contains short quotations from the Hebrew Bible which he uses to proof the doctrine of Trinity.
From the teaching of Abū Rāʾitạ l-Takrītī, the Syrian, Bishop of Nisibis, by which he demonstrates the authenticity of the Christianity received from the Evangelists who called to it by the Holy Gospel, The authenticity of Christianity, shortest of all of Abu Raita's works. Unlike his other works he offers reasoning for Christianity based on its universal acceptance without resorting to scriptures.
Letter to the Christians of Baḥrīn, this letter is mentioned at the end of his second letter on incarnation. Only two brief quotations of this letter have been preserved.

Notes

References

Christian apologists
Syriac Orthodox Christians
9th-century philosophers
People from Tikrit
Christians in the Abbasid Caliphate